Eggestein is a German surname that may refer to
Heinrich Eggestein (c. 1415/1420 – c. 1488), German book printer 
Johannes Eggestein (born 1998), German football player
Maximilian Eggestein (born 1996), German football player, brother of Johannes

German-language surnames